Sant'Omobono is a church in Rome at the foot of the Capitoline Hill in rione Ripa.

It was built in the 15th century and called San Salvatore in Portico. When the church was given to the "Università dei Sarti" (the association of tailors) in 1575, the church was dedicated to their patron saint, Saint Homobonus. Next to it is the Sant'Omobono Area, containing the remains of two Roman temples.

External links

 Sant'Omobono on roman-empire.net
 Comune di Roma/Calabria/Michigan excavations

References

15th-century Roman Catholic church buildings in Italy
Omobono
Omobono